The Thomas Donaghy School is a historic school building at 68 South Street in New Bedford, Massachusetts.  It is a two-story brick structure, roughly rectangular in shape, with a truncated hip roof pierced by hip roof dormers.  Sections project on the eastern and western facades of the building.  The Romanesque Revival-style school was designed by locally prominent architect Samuel C. Hunt, and built in 1905.  It is the city's oldest surviving "modern" school building.

The building was listed on the National Register of Historic Places in 1989.

See also
National Register of Historic Places listings in New Bedford, Massachusetts

References

School buildings on the National Register of Historic Places in Massachusetts
Buildings and structures in New Bedford, Massachusetts
National Register of Historic Places in New Bedford, Massachusetts